"Code Monkey" is a song by Jonathan Coulton, released on 14 April 2006 and part of his album Thing a Week Three released in December 2006. It is one of his most popular songs and has since been downloaded over one million times. The song is about a computer programmer who thinks in ape-like terms, and has been described as a "rocking anthem about dead-end programming jobs."

The song was accidentally mastered and released in mono on the album Thing a Week Three. Jonathan Coulton later released the song in stereo for his compilation album JoCo Looks Back. Although it does not have an official music video, it is still Coulton's most popular original song, having developed a small-yet-devoted cult following.

In other media 
A music video for the song was created by Mike Spiff Booth using imagery from the World of Warcraft video game series and uploaded to YouTube on September 23, 2006.

The song has appeared in television commercials, and is the theme song for the G4 television network show Code Monkeys.

In 2008, the song was featured in an animated video presented at a free ASIFA event, written by Tom Weiser and IdleAmbition.

In 2012, Chicago-based performance troupe VStheUNIVERSE released a short film based on Coulton's work entitled "Code Monkey."

References 

2006 songs
Jonathan Coulton songs
Television theme songs
2008 songs
Geek rock
Songs about primates